Epiparbattia is a genus of moths of the family Crambidae.

Species
Epiparbattia gloriosalis Caradja, 1925
Epiparbattia oligotricha Zhang & Li in Zhang & Li, 2005

References

Pyraustinae
Crambidae genera